Z4349 is an opioid analgesic drug developed in the 1990s by the pharmaceutical company Zambon. It is a derivative of an older drug viminol, which has been modified to improve potency and metabolic stability. In tests on mice it was found to be several hundred times the potency of morphine.

See also 
 2F-Viminol
 Desnitroetonitazene

References 

Analgesics
Designer drugs
Opioids